Currently, There are at least 108 mountains on Earth with elevations of  or greater above sea level. The vast majority of these mountains are located on the edge of the Indian and Eurasian plates in China, India, Nepal and Pakistan.

The dividing line between a mountain with multiple peaks and separate mountains is not always clear (see also Highest unclimbed mountain). A popular and intuitive way to distinguish mountains from subsidiary peaks is by their height above the highest saddle connecting it to a higher summit, a measure called topographic prominence or re-ascent (the higher summit is called the "parent peak"). A common definition of a mountain is a summit with  prominence. Alternatively, a relative prominence (prominence/height) is used (usually 7–8%) to reflect that in higher mountain ranges everything is on a larger scale. The table below lists the highest 100 summits with at least  prominence, approximating a 7% relative prominence. A drawback of a prominence-based list is that it may exclude well-known or spectacular mountains that are connected via a high ridge to a taller summit, such as Eiger, Nuptse or Annapurna IV. A few such peaks and mountains with nearly sufficient prominence are included in this list, and given a rank of "S".

It is very unlikely that all given heights are correct to the nearest metre; indeed, the sea level is often problematic to define when a mountain is remote from the sea. Different sources often differ by many metres, and the heights given below may well differ from those elsewhere in this encyclopedia. These discrepancies serve to emphasize the uncertainties in the listed heights.

Though some parts of the world, especially the most mountainous parts, have never been thoroughly mapped, it is unlikely that any mountains this high have been overlooked, because synthetic aperture radar can and has been used to measure elevations of most otherwise inaccessible places. Still, heights or prominences may be revised, so that the order of the list may change and even new mountains could enter the list over time. To be safe, the list has been extended to include all  peaks.

The highest mountains above sea level are generally not the highest above the surrounding terrain. There is no precise definition of surrounding base, but Denali, Mount Kilimanjaro and Nanga Parbat are possible candidates for the tallest mountain on land by this measure.

The highest mountains are also not generally the most voluminous. Mauna Loa is the largest mountain on Earth in terms of base area (about ) and volume (about ), although, due to the intergrade of lava from Kilauea, Hualalai and Mauna Kea, the volume can only be estimated based on surface area and height of the edifice. Mount Kilimanjaro is the largest non-shield volcano in terms of both base area and volume. Mount Logan is the largest non-volcanic mountain in base area.

The highest mountains above sea level are also not those with peaks farthest from the centre of the Earth, because the figure of the Earth is not spherical. Sea level closer to the equator is several kilometres farther from the centre of the Earth. The summit of Chimborazo, Ecuador's tallest mountain, is usually considered to be the farthest point from the Earth's centre, although the southern summit of Peru's tallest mountain, Huascarán, is another contender. Both have elevations above sea level more than  less than that of Everest.

Geographical distribution

Almost all mountains in the list are located in the Himalaya and Karakoram ranges to the south and west of the Tibetan plateau. All peaks  or higher are located in East, Central or South Asia in a rectangle edged by Noshaq on the Afghanistan–Pakistan border in the west, Jengish Chokusu (Tuōmù'ěr Fēng) on the Kyrgyzstan–Xinjiang border to the north, Gongga Shan (Minya Konka) in Sichuan to the east, and Kabru on the Sikkim–Nepal border to the south.

, the highest peaks on four of the mountains — Gangkhar Puensum, Labuche Kang III, Karjiang, and Tongshanjiabu, all located in Bhutan or China — have not been ascended. The most recent peak to have its first ever ascent is Saser Kangri II East, in India, on 24 August 2011.

The highest mountain outside of Asia is Aconcagua, the 189th highest in the world.

List of world's highest peaks

Data plots

By country

The following graph ranks the countries by number of mountain peaks over 7,200 metres (23,622 ft) above sea level. Note that 38  peaks are on de facto borders and two (Jongsong Peak and Sia Kangri) are on tripoints.

Stem and leaf plot
The following is a stem and leaf plot of the above data. The two digits to the left of the line are the first two digits of the mountain's height (metres), and each digit to the right of the line represents the third digit of the mountain's height. Each number on the right is linked to the corresponding mountain's article. Also, it is apparent that there are five mountains above .

88 | 4
87 | 
86 | 1
85 | 8 1
84 | 8
83 | 
82 |
81 | 8 6 6 2
80 | 9 8 5 3 2
79 | 5 4 3 3
78 | 9 8 7 6 2 2 1 0

77 | 9 9 8 8 5 5 4 1 0 0
76 |
9 7 6 6 4 1 1
75 | 7 7 5 5 4 4 4 3 3 1 1
74 | 9 9 9 9 7 6 6 6 5 5 3 3 2 2 2 1 1 1 0 0 0
73 | 8 8 8 8 8 6 6 5 5 5 4 2 1 1 1 0
72 | 9 9 9 8 8 8 8 7 7 6 6 5 4 4 4 3 2 2 1 1 0 0 0 0 0 0 0

Gallery

See also

List of elevation extremes by country
List of mountain peaks by prominence
List of mountain peaks of Uttarakhand
List of mountain ranges of the world
List of mountains by elevation
List of mountains on Mars by height
List of past presumed highest mountains
List of tallest mountains in the Solar System
List of the highest major summits of North America
List of unclimbed mountains of Nepal
List of volcanoes by elevation
Lists of mountains
Olympus Mons, the tallest mountain on any planet in the Solar System
Rheasilvia crater's central peak, the tallest mountain in the Solar System

Notes

References

Sources

 
 
  (1990–2005).
 
 Some other topographic maps and much from the external links listed above
 Soviet military 1:100,000 topographic maps (most from 1980 to 1981)

External links
 SummitPost.org (currently with detailed description of 30 of the top 100 peaks)
 Prominence lists (including all mountains in the world with >1,450m prominence)
 Alpine Club Himalayan index (Especially informative for history of ascents and location of obscure peaks)
 Discussion of frequently misquoted elevations
 BlankontheMap site on mountains of Northern Kashmir
 Digital elevation data, including all the above peaks and many more worldwide
 Hispar area: expedition reports and maps
 List of highest mountains down to 6750 metres
 Google Earth Community (Google Earth KMZ file of Wikipedia list of highest mountains)
List of worlds highest mountains in Nepal

Mountains, Highest
 
Mountains, Highest
Highest things